Béarnaise dances (French - danses béarnaises) are the traditional dances in Béarn, the best-known of which is the  rond or rondeau de Gascogne .

Context

Accompaniment

Instruments

Song

Origins

Evolution

See also 
 Fandango
 Breton dance
 Basque dance

Basque culture
European folk dances
French dances